Carlos Alberto da Rocha Resende (born 29 May 1971) is a Portuguese former handball player and a current coach who last coached S.L. Benfica.

He played most of his career at FC Porto, except for a period of five years when he represented ABC Braga. He started his coach career in 2006 at Porto, joining ABC Braga in 2011, where he stayed until 2017.

Resende is the most capped player of all-time for the Portugal national team, with 250 matches. He played three times at the World Men's Handball Championship, in 1997, 2001 and 2003.

Honours

Player
Portuguese League: 7
Portuguese Cup: 5
Portuguese League Cup: 3
Portuguese Super Cup: 1

Individual
EHF Champions League Top Scorer: 1995–96, 1996–97

Coach
Portuguese League: 2008–09, 2015–16
Portuguese Cup: 2006–07, 2014–15, 2016–17, 2017–18
Portuguese League Cup: 2007–08
Portuguese Super Cup: 2015, 2018
EHF Challenge Cup: 2015–16

Distinction
Sports Merit Medal

See also
List of handballers with 1000 or more international goals

References

1971 births
Living people
Sportspeople from Lisbon
Portuguese male handball players
FC Porto handball players
Portuguese handball coaches
S.L. Benfica handball managers